Ngaut Ngaut Conservation Park, formerly Ngautngaut Conservation Park, is a protected area in the Australian state of South Australia. it is on the Eastern bank of the Murray River downstream of the town of Nildottie. It is co-managed by the Government of South Australia and the Nganguraku people.

The conservation park consists of land in sections 88,  89  and 413 in the cadastral unit of the Hundred of Nildottie. The land first received protected area status as a conservation park  proclaimed under the National Parks and Wildlife Act 1972 on 17 June 1976 in respect to sections 88 and 89. Land in section 413 was added on 25 August 2005. Its name was changed from "Ngautngaut" to "Ngaut Ngaut"  on 28 September 2006 to "reflect the accepted Aboriginal spelling of the rock shelter" after which the conservation park was named.

It is the birthplace of the "black duck dreaming" and preserves Aboriginal rock art and culture.

The conservation park is classified as IUCN Category III protected area.

References

External links
Official webpage
Webpage on BirdsSA website

Conservation parks of South Australia
Protected areas established in 1976
1976 establishments in Australia
Co-managed protected areas in South Australia